Andrew Perry may refer to:

 Andrew Perry (Hampshire cricketer) (born 1976), former English cricketer for Hampshire
 Andrew Perry (Sussex cricketer) (born 1984), former English cricketer for Sussex